Fast Talk with Boy Abunda is a 2023 Philippine television talk show broadcast by GMA Network. Directed by Rommel Gacho, it is hosted by Boy Abunda. It premiered on January 23, 2023 on the network's Afternoon Prime line up.

The show is streaming online on YouTube.

Ratings

According to AGB Nielsen Philippines' Nationwide Urban Television Audience Measurement People in Television Homes, the pilot episode of Fast Talk with Boy Abunda earned a 7.5% rating.

References

External links 
 
 

2023 Philippine television series debuts
Entertainment news shows in the Philippines
Filipino-language television shows
GMA Network original programming
Philippine television talk shows